Hemiscopis intermedialis is a moth in the family Crambidae. It was described by Eugene G. Munroe in 1977. It is found in Indonesia, where it has been recorded from Sumba.

References

Moths described in 1977
Odontiinae